Biron may refer to:

Places 
France
 Biron, Charente-Maritime, in the Charente-Maritime department
 Biron, Dordogne, in the Dordogne department
 Château de Biron, in the village of Biron, Dordogne
 Biron, Pyrénées-Atlantiques, in the Pyrénées-Atlantiques department
United States
 Biron, Wisconsin

People 
 Biron (surname), includes a list of people with the surname
 Biron House (born 1884-1930), English cricketer

Other uses 
 Biron, original name of the centaur who later became Comet (DC Comics)
 Biron (or Berowne), a light-headed, light-tongued lord in the suite of the King of Navarre, in Shakespeare's Love's Labor's Lost
 Biron, a character in the tragedy The Fatal Marriage, by Thomas Southerne; the husband of Isabella, and brother of Carlos

See also 
 Byron (disambiguation)